K. V. Ramakrishnan is a Malayalam–language poet and journalist from Kerala state, South India. He received the Kerala Sahitya Akademi Award in the year 1997 for his work Akshara Vidya.

Biography
Ramakrishnan was born in Kadampuzha in Malappuram district of Kerala as the son of  M. Raghava Variar and K. V. Parvathy Varasyar. After completing graduation, he worked in the government service from 1954 to 1962 and then obtained his master's degree from Maharaja's College, Ernakulam. He was a professor of English language in Mar Athanasius College of Engineering, Kothamangalam and Sree Krishna College, Guruvayur from where he retired in 1988 to join Mathrubhumi as the assistant editor of the Mathrubhumi Weekly.

Works

Essay
 Kavithayum Thalavum
 Kavya Chinthakal

Translation
 Dracula
 Kanakabharanam
 Rabindranath Tagore

Awards
 1997: Kerala Sahitya Akademi Award for Poetry - Akshara Vidya
 2015: Deviprasadam Trust Award
 Kanakasree Award - Akshara Vidya
 State Bank of India Literary Award

References

Year of birth missing (living people)
Living people
Indian male poets
Indian magazine editors
Malayali people
Poets from Kerala
People from Malappuram district
Journalists from Kerala
Malayalam-language writers
Malayalam poets
Malayalam-language journalists
Recipients of the Kerala Sahitya Akademi Award
20th-century Indian translators
20th-century Indian poets
20th-century Indian journalists
Indian male journalists
Translators to Malayalam
20th-century Indian male writers